The 40th Filmfare Awards South Ceremony honouring the winners of the best of South Indian cinema in 1992 is an event held on 13 October 1993 was an event held at the Kamaraj Hall, Madras.

Awards

Main awards

Kannada cinema

Malayalam cinema

Tamil cinema

Telugu cinema

Special  Awards

Awards Presentation

 Srihari Khoday (Best Film Kannada) Received Award from Parthiban
 Sibi Malayil (Best Film Malayalam) Received Award from Rehman
 Devi Varaprasad (Best Film Telugu) Received Award from Priya Raman
 Pushpa Kandasamy (Best Film Tamil) Received Award from Lavanya
 T. S. Nagabharana (Best Director Kannada) Received Award from Seetha
 Sibi Malayi (Best Director Malayalam) Received Award from Suresh Krishna
 K. Vishwanath (Best Director Telugu) Received Award from Khushbu
 K. Balachander (Best Director Tamil) Received Award from Sarika
 C. Ashwath (Best Music Director Kannada) Received Award from Seema
 Bombay Ravi (Best Music Director Malayalam) Received Award from Sridhar
 K. V. Mahadevan (Best Music Director Malayalam) Received Award from Rupini
 A. R. Rahman (Best Music Director Tamil) Received Award from Nafisa Ali
 Sudha Rani (Best Actress Kannada) Received Award from S.P. Muthuraman
 Geetha (Best Actress Malayalam) Received Award from A. Nageswara Rao
 Revathy (Best Actress Telugu) Received Award from Reena Roy
 Revathy (Best Actress Tamil) Received Award from Pehlaj Nihalani
 Charuhasan (Best Actor Kannada) Received Award from Heera
 Murali (Best Actor Malayalam) Received Award from Chunky Pandey
 Chiranjeevi (Best Actor Telugu) Received Award from Mammootty
 Kamal Haasan (Best Actor Tamil) Received Award from Dimple Kapadia
 Sai Prasad Receives L. V. Prasad Award (Lifetime Achievement Award) from Vyjayantimala

References

 Filmfare Magazine December 1993

External links
 
 

Filmfare Awards South